The Soviet Union's 1977 nuclear test series was a group of 24 nuclear tests conducted in 1977. These tests  followed the 1976 Soviet nuclear tests series and preceded the 1978 Soviet nuclear tests series.

References

1977
1977 in the Soviet Union
1977 in military history
Explosions in 1977